Patterson Road is a major road between Kwinana and Rockingham and is part of Australia's National Route 1 for part of its length. The first part goes through Kwinana's heavy industrial area. After the Ennis Avenue turnoff which takes Highway 1 with it, Patterson Road becomes State Route 18 and goes through the Rockingham Beach area until it turns into Railway Terrace one block from the ocean at Mangles Bay, which is part of the Indian Ocean.

Until the Kwinana Freeway was built to Safety Bay Road in 2002, Patterson Road was the main road to Mandurah and the South West of Western Australia from Perth. The Freeway construction has relieved pressure on the road.

Major intersections
All intersection below are controlled by traffic signals unless otherwise indicated.

See also

References

Roads in Perth, Western Australia
City of Rockingham
Highway 1 (Australia)